Alex Finney may refer to:

 Alex Finney (footballer, born 1996), English footballer
 Alex Finney (footballer, born 1902) (1902–1982), English footballer